Charles Benbow House is a historic home located near Oak Ridge, Guilford County, North Carolina. It was built sometime after 1814, and consists of a two-story, three-bay main brick block and a one-story, three-bay brick wing.  The house incorporates Georgian, Federal, and Greek Revival style design elements and embodies stylistic elements of Quaker architecture.

It was listed on the National Register of Historic Places in 1982.

References

Houses on the National Register of Historic Places in North Carolina
Georgian architecture in North Carolina
Federal architecture in North Carolina
Greek Revival houses in North Carolina
Houses in Guilford County, North Carolina
National Register of Historic Places in Guilford County, North Carolina